The Côte de Lumière refers to the seaside resorts located along the coast of the Vendée, France.

Communes situated on the coast, from north to south, include:
 Noirmoutier-en-l'Ile
 Barbâtre
 La Barre-de-Monts
 Notre-Dame-de-Monts
 Saint-Jean-de-Monts
 Saint-Hilaire-de-Riez
 Saint-Gilles-Croix-de-Vie
 Bretignolles-sur-Mer
 Brem-sur-Mer
 Olonne-sur-Mer
 Les Sables d'Olonne
 Château-d'Olonne
 Talmont-Saint-Hilaire
 Jard-sur-Mer
 Saint-Vincent-sur-Jard
 Longeville-sur-Mer
 La Tranche-sur-Mer
 La Faute-sur-Mer

External links 

Geography of Vendée
Seaside resorts in France
Tourist attractions in Vendée
Lumiere
Landforms of Pays de la Loire